Tänassilma is a village in Saku Parish, Harju County in northern Estonia.

Tänassilma Technological Village is located on the Pärnu road near the Tallinn city boundary.

References

External links
Tänassilma Technological Village

Villages in Harju County